Courageous Conservatives PAC, a federal political action committee, was first established in 2015 to help conservative candidates win election against moderate candidates. Christopher Ekstrom, a Dallas-based Republican investor, chairs the PAC.

Leadership 
Christopher Ekstrom is the Chairman of Courageous Conservatives PAC and also Conservative Response Team. Ekstrom is a vocal critic of the Democratic Party and moderate wing of the Republican Party. Ekstrom publicly attacked U.S. Senator John McCain for his votes to confirm Ruth Bader Ginsburg, John Kerry, and Eric Holder.

Political activity 
In 2016 the PAC supported Texas U.S. Senator Ted Cruz in his bid for President and made advertisements against Marco Rubio and his Gang of Eight Amnesty proposal made during his presidential campaign, as well as Jeb Bush and Donald Trump. Dr. James Dobson, founder of Focus on the Family voiced an advertisement in support of Senator Ted Cruz through the PAC.

In November 2016 Courageous Conservatives PAC released a pro Steve Bannon advertisement after President Donald Trump named Bannon as his top policy aide.

During the Alabama U.S. Senate Special Election to fill Jeff Sessions U.S. Senate seat, Courageous Conservative PAC endorsed Alabama Congressman Mo Brooks. In referencing Roy Moore during the endorsement of Mo Brooks on June 15th, 2017 the PAC stated "There’s a real legitimate concern that with a special election on December 12th that Roy Moore as our nominee could actually lose an Alabama Senate seat to a Democrat." Courageous Conservatives PAC endorsed Roy Moore during the runoff election and in the general election.

After Roy Moore lost to Doug Jones in the 2017 special election, the PAC ran robocalls against Alabama U.S. Senator Richard Shelby after he stated "“couldn’t vote for Roy Moore.” The ad stated "Sen. Richard Shelby stabbed President Trump and conservatives in the back, Tell Shelby you’ll never forget his disloyalty to President Trump and the Republican Party for his treasonous actions. Tell Shelby he’s betrayed his trust to Alabamians and he should resign his office. Call now." 

In the 2018 Arizona Republican Primary Courageous Conservatives PAC supported Lt. Col. Wendy Rogers where she won on August 28th, 2018.

References

External links

United States political action committees
Republican Party (United States) organizations
Conservative organizations in the United States